Bastard Boys is an Australian television miniseries broadcast on the ABC in 2007. It tells the story of the 1998 Australian waterfront dispute. The script, published by Currency Press, won the 2007 Queensland Premier's Literary Award for Best Television Script.

Plot
The series tells the story of the waterfront dispute from four points of view: Greg's War from the point of view of union leader Greg Combet, Josh's War from the point of view of lawyer Josh Bornstein, Sean's War from the point of view of dock worker Sean McSwain and Chris' War from the point of view of Patrick Stevedores Managing Director Chris Corrigan.

Cast
 Daniel Frederiksen as Greg Combet
 Justin Smith as Josh Bornstein
 Anthony Hayes as Sean McSwain
 Geoff Morrell as Chris Corrigan
 Rhys Muldoon as Julian Burnside, QC
 Francis Greenslade as Bill Kelty
Mike Bishop as Peter Reith
 Jack Thompson as Tony Tully
 Dan Wyllie as Brendan Tully
 Lucy Bell as Petra Hilsen
 Colin Friels as John Coombs
 Deborah Kennedy as Gwen Coombs
 Christopher Widdows as Garry Coombs
 Caroline Craig as Tali Bernard
 Justine Clarke as Janine McSwain
 Jeremy Kewley as Frank Parry
 Kevin Harrington as Derek Corrigan
 Helen Thomson as Valerie Corrigan
 Anna Lise Phillips as Cherie Snape
Louis Corbett as Joe Corrigan
Richard Heath as Podge

Episodes

Degree of fictionalisation

Most of the characters portrayed are real individuals, many of whom were interviewed in the process of writing the drama.  However, a number of characters were invented and events were considerably compressed for dramatic purposes. Notably, the waterside workers portrayed in the drama were composites, based on interviews with many waterside workers.

Another example of invention was the placing of lawyer Josh Bornstein at a key protest, which would have been illegal because of a court injunction

Response
Liberal Senator Concetta Fierravanti-Wells said in 2006, while the series was still in production, that it "smacks of another example of wasteful spending by the ABC, being used to drive an anti-government, pro-left agenda, conveniently timed to appear during an election year". Journalist Michael Duffy described the series as "the most blatant union propaganda" and was critical that "80 per cent of the story is told from the union point of view". The Age'''s Debi Enker, however, described it as a "thoughtful, illuminating and superbly cast account of a seminal event in our recent history [which] represents exactly the kind of drama that one would want the national broadcaster to nurture."

Chris Corrigan was heavily critical of the series, stating after its screening that "[t]he program portrays a series of predictable stereotypes and silly caricatures and gives them real names then cleverly claims to be a drama and hence does not explore any inconvenient truths such as the impact of the waterfront rorts on ordinary Australians."

Then-Prime Minister John Howard declared the series "[o]ne of the most lopsided pieces of political propaganda I've seen on the national broadcaster in years" and argued that it completely ignored the notorious inefficiency of the Australian waterfront and years of collaborative failures to change this.

Criticism has also emerged from some members of the union movement. According to Phillip Adams, Bill Kelty was concerned that "no researcher, writer or producer - spoke to him about the dispute or his role in it. Yet they haven't hesitated to put words into their Kelty's mouth that the original Kelty never said". Chris Corrigan's brother Derek Corrigan has disputed claims that the broadcasting of Bastard Boys'' was timed to support Greg Combet's run for politics".

Home media 
The series has been issued by ABC and Roadshow Entertainment in their "Masters collection" as a two-DVD set (220 mins), packaged with another Labor-oriented tele-film Curtin (93 mins) as a third disc.

See also
 List of Australian television series

References

External links

Period television series
Articles containing video clips
2000s Australian television miniseries
2007 Australian television series debuts
2007 Australian television series endings